Morenetangen ("The Moraine Spit") is a headland in Sørkapp Land at Spitsbergen, Svalbard. It is located at the northern side of the bay of Isbukta, at the eastern coast of Spitsbergen.

References

Headlands of Spitsbergen